or the  is an indoor arena and conference venue in Tokushima, Tokushima, Japan. The arena opened in 1993.

"ASTY" in the venue's name is an acronym which stands for "Attractive Space in Tokushima Yamashiro".

Notable sports events hosted by the arena include the official 2007 Asian Basketball Championship.

Construction
Asty Tokushima was constructed for three years, from July 1991 until September 1993. It was opened in October 20, 1993.

Features
Asty Tokushima's main feature is its multi-purpose hall which has a maximum seating capacity of 5000 to accommodate large-scale conferences and conventions. This figure is smaller for rock festivals, concerts and sporting events such as professional tennis, volleyball and sumo matches, where the maximum possible seating capacity is 4,000. The hall's whole  space could be used for trade fairs and exhibitions.

There are also 6 conference rooms within the venue with a capacity of 75-150 people each and 2 special conference rooms with 150-300 seating capacity. The Flair Tokushima Hall is another room within the venue with 142 fixed seating capacity and there are two training rooms hosted within the venue as well with 54 and 24 seating capacity respectively.

References

External links

Indoor arenas in Japan
Basketball venues in Japan
Volleyball venues in Japan
Sumo venues in Japan
Tennis venues in Japan
Sports venues in Tokushima Prefecture
Convention centers in Japan
Tokushima (city)
Sports venues completed in 1993
1993 establishments in Japan